A gore is an irregular parcel of land, as small as a triangle of median in a street intersection or as large as an unincorporated area the size of a township.

In old English law, a gore was a small, narrow strip of land. In modern land law and surveying a gore is a strip of land, usually triangular in shape, as might be left between surveys that do not close. In some northeastern U.S. states (mainly northern New England), a gore (sometimes a land grant or purchase) remains as an unincorporated area of a county that is not part of any town, has limited self-government, and may be unpopulated.

History 
Historically, North American named gores were most often the result of errors when the land was first surveyed and Colonial era land patents and, later, towns were laid out. A gore would be created by conflicting surveys, resulting in two or more patentees claiming the same land, or lie in an area between two supposedly abutting towns but technically in neither. Surrounding towns have been known to absorb a gore—for example, the gore between Tunbridge and Royalton, Vermont, was eventually incorporated into Tunbridge. Some gores have become towns in their own right, such as Stannard, Vermont.

As unincorporated territories 
Different states have different laws governing gores and other unincorporated territories. In Maine, all unincorporated territories (whether townships, gores, or grants) are governed directly by the Land Use Planning Commission, a state agency. They do not, therefore, enjoy the rights and obligations of direct local self-governance of a corporate Maine municipality, via local elections of town boards of selectmen, and town meetings that debate and approve the town budget and expenditures. Occasionally, a town will choose to become unincorporated after having been an incorporated town; a recent example of this is the former town of Madrid, Maine.

Sample New England gores 
Some of New England's gores include:

* Not considered a census-designated place by the United States Census, but legally considered a minor civil division by the state of Maine

References

See also 
 Gaps and gores
 Gore (segment)
 Land surveying

New England
Political divisions of the United States
Local government in Vermont